Glendon College is a public liberal arts college in Toronto, Ontario, Canada. Formally the federated bilingual campus of York University, it is one of the school's nine colleges and 11 faculties with 100 full-time faculty members and a student population of about 2,100. 
Founded as the first permanent establishment of York University, the school began academic operation under the mentorship of the University of Toronto in September 1960. Under the York University Act 1959 legislation, York was once an affiliated institution of the University of Toronto, where the first cohort of faculty and students originally utilized the Falconer Hall building (now part of the Faculty of Law) as a temporary home before relocating north of the St. George campus to Glendon Hall — an estate that was willed by Edward Rogers Wood for post-secondary purposes.

In 1962, a landlot grant was offered by the Province of Ontario to build a new university, which eventually ceased the bilateral partnership between the two schools. York University became an independent institution, however, Glendon refused to transfer to the main Keele Campus, as the University of Toronto had no interest in reacquiring or maintaining the donated Wood property. Murray G. Ross and diplomat Escott Reid, who mutually proposed a novel plan for the college to educate students for fields in civil service, governance and academia, were appointed president and principal in 1959 and 1965, respectively. In 1966, Glendon was officially inaugurated by Prime Minister Lester B. Pearson with the objective of "helping its students develop an informed and active interest in public affairs; by encouraging them to become committed to improving the community in which they live; the country of which they are citizens; and the world which they occupy."

Bilingualism 
Glendon College's undergraduate curriculum emphasizes languages, communication, international affairs, and public policy. Due to this, the Government of Ontario declared Glendon the country's first "Centre of Excellence for French language and Bilingual Postsecondary Education," in collaboration with Collège Boréal. Because of Glendon's bilingual nature, the campus received partial designation as an institution offering French services under the province's French Language Services Act.

Language skill assessments are given to new students to determine the level needed to take to fulfill Glendon's second-language requirement. Students who attain higher levels can either take advanced-level language instruction in their second language, or a discipline course taught solely in their second language. In addition, a variety of non-credit classes and programmes are offered by the college to students, faculty and the general public including introductory courses in foreign languages (Arabic, Cantonese, German, Italian, Japanese, Mandarin Chinese, Persian, Portuguese, Romanian, Spanish, Tibetan); indigenous languages in Inuktitut and Ojibway; and professional development courses in English and French. Students also have the opportunity to take other language courses available through the Languages, Literature and Linguistics department at York University.

This bilingual approach to university education is said to be unique in Canada, because all students within Glendon College are required to study both English and French. Canada's other bilingual post-secondary institutions, including portions of Concordia University, Laurentian University, University of Alberta (Faculté St-Jean), and the University of Ottawa, often educate students in one language or the other. Although each one offers students the option of a fully bilingual education, Glendon is the only institution in Canada where all anglophone and francophone students are required to take at least one compulsory class in their second language, regardless of their initial ability in the language.

The Université de l'Ontario français was established in April 2018 whose sole instructional language was French to serve francophones in the Central and Southwestern Ontario region. The Ontario and federal governments came to a funding agreement for the new university, which could start offering courses to full-time students in 2021. Some data suggest that Franco-Ontarian participation rates in university are comparable to that of English speakers, obviating the need for a French-language university. Advocates for a university whose sole instructional language is French have suggested that once it begins to accept full-time students, Glendon College should cease to offer courses in French.

Degrees 
Glendon is a primarily undergraduate institution where academics are rooted in the liberal arts tradition, although the college mainly specializes in the social sciences and humanities. Glendon offers 19 undergraduate degrees (BA) and 20 international Bachelor of Arts (iBA) concentrations. Glendon has a unique concurrent and consecutive Bachelor of Education (B.Ed) focused specifically on preparing teachers for French immersion, extended French and core French teaching positions in anglophone schools. Recently, Glendon initiated its first BSc/iBSc degrees in psychology and biology, a new BA/iBA degree in communications, and a business administration and international studies dual degree (BBA/iBA) in partnership with the EMLYON Business School in France.

There are also concurrent/consecutive certificate programs in a variety of fields (teaching English as an international language (D-TEIL), law and social thought, rédaction professionnelle (offered in French only), refugee and migration studies, sexuality studies, Spanish/English – English-Spanish translation, and technical and professional communication).

Since its inception in the early 1960s, the Glendon has grown to also include graduate programs in French Studies (M.A.), Public and International Affairs (M.P.I.A.), Translation Studies (M.A.) and Conference Interpretation (M.C.I.). The translation and interpreting masters build on the college's strength in languages while the public and international affairs degree is affiliated with the Glendon School of Public and International Affairs. There is also a doctoral degree in Francophone Studies (Ph.D.).

Any student attending Glendon can enroll in up to 50 percent of his or her classes at the larger Keele campus, and vice versa. This policy is meant to give students the resources of a larger university while retaining the qualities and features of a small college.

Student life 
Mirroring the campus life of small-scale American institutions like Swarthmore and Williams, Glendon has a tight-knit community within the larger student population of their sister campus. Various campus events are organized by the Glendon College Student Union/l'Association Étudiante du Collège Glendon (GCSU/AÉCG) and its membership includes all students enrolled in courses at Glendon College and elects a council to represent them. Students can join and access a number of clubs and organizations on both of the campuses. Glendon has a newspaper (Pro Tem), York University's premier and longest student-run campus publication that is published in both English and French; a campus radio station (Radio Glendon); the Grand Rassemblement de l’Éducation en Français (GREF): Glendon's French-language publishing house; and a black box theatre company, Theatre Glendon/Théâtre Glendon, in addition to similar media from York University.

Other facilities exist for students, such as a student lounge, a cafeteria, campus gym memberships, workshops, IT services, and a liaison office for prospective students. The college also encourages students to utilize academic resources on both campuses. The college's proximity to Yonge and Eglinton and Downtown Toronto makes its location ideal for students who want to partake in the city's diverse array of social and cultural attractions. Glendon College is also where the first issue of the Toronto Special newspaper was published, according to the National Post. The Salon Francophone, situated in the main building, is a social resource centre and a club, which organizes multiple activities to promote the French language.

Glendon was initially planned on being a residential college where students were required to live on campus, however, over the past few decades increases in the student population outnumbered the available residential spaces. Therefore, the majority of students commute, while only around 400 students live on campus. Glendon's international profile attracts students from over 100 countries, in particular, a significant number of francophone students from across Canada (notably Quebec) and around the world, including France, Haiti, Belgium, Morocco, and Algeria. Approximately 1/3 of the student population are francophone. Additionally, Glendon has a visible hispanophone presence with more than 20% studying Spanish as a third language. The Spanish Resource Centre library at Glendon is a joint initiative between the Ministry of Education of the Government of Spain and the Hispanic studies department of York University.

Campus 

Glendon occupies the former country estate of Edward Rogers Wood, a prominent Toronto financier and philanthropist of the early 1900s. The estate was built in 1924 and is located at the intersection of Bayview and Lawrence Ave. between the midtown neighbourhoods of Lawrence Park and Bridle Path. The estate was the original York University campus when it was bequeathed by the University of Toronto, and it remained a liberal arts college when York's Keele Campus was inaugurated in 1966. The college is formally one of York's 9 colleges and 11 faculties, and it is considered semi-autonomous within York University.

Glendon's founder and first principal was Canadian diplomat Escott Reid, who foresaw the institution's key mandate to educate future leaders of Canada in both official languages. Historically, the manor served as a temporary home for the Ontario College of Art in 1952, and the Faculty of Law of the University of Toronto in 1956. Moreover, the natural landscape of the 85-acre estate was used as an arboretum by the botany and forestry department at the University of Toronto.

Presently, the college is the institutional home of the Glendon School of Public & International Affairs, the first bilingual graduate school in Canada to offer a MPIA, in collaboration with The Global Brief, Canada's top international affairs publication. The graduate school also operates an interdisciplinary research institute for public policy — the Centre for Global Challenges. The Faculty of Graduate Studies also manages a PhD program and three other distinct MA programs. The Centre of Excellence for French language and Bilingual Post-secondary Education is Glendon's recent expansion and was created to accommodate the growth of incoming students and the increasing demand for multilingual post-secondary education in Southern Ontario. The campus has also played host to several productions, namely American Psycho 2: All American Girl (2002) and The Time Traveler's Wife (2009), which were extensively filmed in and around Glendon. Often, students are incorporated into shooting when the campus is sealed off for the weekends.

In 2011, the Canadian Language Museum was established to promote an appreciation of all the languages used in Canada and their role in the development of this nation.

Buildings and abbreviations 

 York Hall (YH) / Pavillon York: The main building, shaped like an 'h', divided into four sections (the main wing, and the "A", "B", and "C" wings). York Hall has two large lecture halls (one located in the Penthouse; the other in the Center of Excellence), and houses smaller classrooms; departmental and professors' offices; the bookstore; the Rejean Garneau laboratory; the circular senate chamber; the theatre; as well as the school's cafeteria and dining hall. The renovated expansion within "B" Wing—a space enclosed with full-size glass windows housing Glendon Recruitment and Liaison, the office of the student union, dedicated club space, the Salon Francophone, as well as a spacious social common area (to replace the former Salon Garigue lounge).
 The Centre of Excellence (COE) / Le Centre d'excellence: The latest extension to the existing "A" Wing of York Hall. The glass box building was designed by Montreal architect, Renée Daoust, and houses an amphitheatre, a studio, language labs, offices and additional commons space.
Glendon Hall (GH) / Manoir Glendon: Originally the Italianate villa where the Edward R. Wood family resided (his brother Frank Porter Wood lived next door, where the Crescent School is now located). Today, it has two classrooms; an all-purpose room now known as the Bank of Montreal (BMO) Conference Centre; the CKRG campus radio station; the Career and Counselling Centre; Glendon's administrative faculty offices (including that of the principal); the Canadian Language Museum; the Glendon School of Public and International Affairs; as well as the Lunik Café — a student-run cooperative that opened in September 2011. It is known informally as "The Manor."
Leslie Frost Library (FL) / Bibliothèque Leslie Frost: Opened in 1963, the library is named after Leslie Frost, the late Premier of Ontario and graduate of Osgoode Hall Law School. With a collection of over 300,000 items, the library features a computer lab, study rooms, and quiet reading spaces available for all York University students. Adjacent to the library is the Bruce Bryden Rose Garden, a rare and well-preserved example of British landscaping, with characteristics of Victorian & Edwardian influences.
Proctor Field House (PFH) / Pavillon Proctor: The campus athletics building houses the Glendon Athletic Club (GAC). The Glendon Athletic Club offers full gym facilities to students and the public, including a weight room, a cardio room, a pool, tennis and squash courts, an instructional studio, and a gymnasium. Proctor also holds group exercise programs such as spinning classes, yoga, martial arts, and dance lessons. Glendon students enjoy a generous discount for gym membership throughout the academic year. In 1995, Proctor Field House served as the Toronto Raptors' practice facility.
Hilliard Residence (HR) / Résidence Hilliard: A 215-room residence building, named after famed obstetrician Marion Hilliard. Students are divided between 6 dormitory-style houses (A, B, C, E, F, and G, respectively). With the exception of D-house, which is used for some professors' offices and classroom space, and G-house, which has suite-style rooms for upper-year students. A house can hold as many as 40 students. Each house is under the charge of a resident "don", as well as Residence Life Assistants (RLAs) that oversee activities in both residence buildings. Differing from the Wood Residence, each of Hilliard's houses do not exceed a single floor in reach, with two houses per floor. Hilliard also contains the offices of Pro Tem, the Women & Trans Centre and Theatre Glendon storage space in Hilliard's non-residential houses, D and H. The basement of Hilliard Residence contains a recreational room, available for all members of the residence.

Wood Residence (WR) / Résidence Wood: A 189-room residence building. It houses students in typical dormitory-style rooms. Wood is the smaller of the two residences with only 22–30 students per house (section of the building). Students are divided into five houses A through E; each house spans four floors (including the basement) with a single shared common room on the ground floor. Changes in Residence Life programming have led to the creation of a "Quiet Floor" on the third floor of A House for students who wish to enjoy an extension of the regular late-night quiet hours when all residents must avoid inappropriately loud noises. As well, the entirety of C House will become "Green" for students who wish to enjoy a more environmentally friendly lifestyle within the residence.
Greenhouse (GR) / La Serre: The Greenhouse was the Woods' old greenhouse, primarily under the care of Agnes Euphemia Smart, the widow of Mr. Wood. It is now used for the Security, Parking and Transportation Services offices, Housing and Residence services offices, as well as the campus goSAFE student escort service. Generally, students visit the Greenhouse to resolve security and campus fine issues, or for residence related issues such as keys/keycards, tax-exempt stickers for the cafeteria or any maintenance or service required in residence.

Notable alumni 
 Steven Bednarski, Medieval Studies professor and former television voice actor
 Marion Boyd, former politician and MPP for the New Democratic Party
 Mark Breslin, entrepreneur, comedian and co-founder of the comedy club chain Yuk Yuk's
 J. D. Carpenter, author of several suspense novels
 Kim S. Carter, Ombudsman of British Columbia
 C.F. Caunter, British motorcycle, automotive and aviation historian
 Ann Cavoukian, former Ontario Information and Privacy Commissioner
 Chloe Charles, indie singer-songwriter
 David Collenette, former Minister of National Defence, former Federal Minister of Transport
 Mike Ford, member of the popular band Moxy Früvous
 Chantal Hébert, journalist, Toronto Star political columnist
 Gordon Henderson, film producer/writer/director, directed CBC's Canada: A People's History
 Christopher Hume, notable architectural critic for the Toronto Star
 Ronald Kanter, former politician and MPP for the Liberal Party
 M. T. Kelly, novelist, winner of the Governor-General's Award for A Dream Like Mine
 Didier Leclair, novelist, Trillium Book Award and Governor-General's Award winner
 James MacKinnon, professor and head of the economics department at Queen's University
 J.R. Martin, prominent linguist and influential scholar in systemic functional linguistics
 John McNee, Canada's Ambassador to the United Nations, 2006–2011
 Stefan Molyneux, political blogger and writer
 Kate Nelligan, Academy Award-nominated film and theatre actress
 Andrew Nikiforuk, author and journalist
 Spencer Rice, actor and comedian, co-star of Kenny vs. Spenny
 Clayton Ruby, Toronto lawyer, partner with Ruby & Edward
 Sara Singh, MPP and deputy leader of the Ontario NDP
 Greg Sorbara, former Ontario Minister of Finance
 Armine Yalnizyan, economist and writer

Notable faculty 
 Irving Abella, author and historian
 Jean Burnet, professor of ethnic studies and relations, and founder of Glendon's department of sociology
 Jean-Gabriel Castel, RSC OC, lawyer, author
 Christopher Dewdney, author
 Alex Himelfarb, former Clerk of the Privy Council and Director of the Glendon School of Public and International Affairs
 John W. Holmes, diplomat and professor of international relations (1971–1981)
 Michiel Horn, RSC, official historian of York University
 Michael Ondaatje, novelist and poet
 Norman Penner, historian, war veteran, professor emeritus of political science (1972–1995)
 Graham Reed, author and psychologist
 Anne Russon, psychologist prominent in primates discourse and cognition
 John T. Saywell, Dean and institutor of York University's arts and sciences department
 Lorie Tarshis, economist and professor (1982-1988)
 Ellen Meiksins Wood, RSC, political scientist, Marxist historian and scholar

References

External links 
 Glendon College

 
Liberal arts colleges
York University
Universities and colleges in Toronto
Educational institutions established in 1959
French-language universities and colleges in Ontario
Colleges in Ontario
Universities in Ontario
1959 establishments in Ontario